Robert Young (born 1939) was an American football former player, coach, and Christian spiritual leader. A native of Beresford, South Dakota, he served as the head football coach at the University of Sioux Falls from 1983 to 2004, compiling a record of 172–69–3.  His 1996 Sioux Falls Cougars team won the NAIA Football Championship.  His football teams were also NAIA runners-up in 2001, semifinalists in 1997, 2002, 2003, and quarterfinalists in 1995, 1998, and 2004.  Young won nine South Dakota Intercollegiate Conference (SDIC) titles and four Great Plains Athletic Conference (GPAC) titles.  His teams ran off conference winning streaks of 27 games from 1994 to 1999 and 34 games from 2001 to 2004.  He is the winningest coach in Sioux Falls Cougars football history. Young was considered to be a spiritual leader within the lives of former players, often hosting virtual meetings with them to provide mentoring and spiritual guidance.

Head coaching record

College

References

1939 births
Living people
Date of birth missing (living people)
Arizona State University alumni
High school football coaches in South Dakota
Players of American football from South Dakota
Sioux Falls Cougars football coaches
Sioux Falls Cougars football players
High school football coaches in Iowa
High school football coaches in Arizona
People from Beresford, South Dakota